Nelson Mandela Bridge is a bridge in Johannesburg, South Africa. It is the fourth of five bridges which cross the railway lines and sidings located just west of Johannesburg Park Station, the first being the Johan Rissik Bridge adjacent to the station. It was completed in 2003, and cost R38 million to build. The proposal for the bridge was to link up two main business areas of Braamfontein and Newtown as well as to rejuvenate and to a certain level modernise the inner city. The bridge forms part of the M27 Route of Johannesburg.

History
A bridge linking Braamfontein to the Johannesburg city centre was first mooted by Steve Thorne and Gordon Gibson, urban designers, in 1993 in their urban design study of the Inner City of Johannesburg.  In their study they named the bridge the Nelson Mandela bridge in recognition of the role Nelson Mandela was having in uniting South African society, and the symbolism of linkage and unity provided by the bridge.

Structural design
The bridge was constructed over 42 railway lines without disturbing railway traffic and is 284 metres long.
There are two pylons, North and South, 42 and 27 metres high respectively. Engineers tried to keep the bridge as light as possible and used a structural steel with a concrete composite deck to keep weight down. Heavier banks along the bridge were reinforced by heavier back spans. The bridge consists of two lanes and has pedestrian walk-ways on either side. The bridge can be viewed from one of Johannesburg's most popular roads, the M1 highway.

References

Bridges in South Africa
Bridges completed in 2003
Buildings and structures in Johannesburg
21st-century architecture in South Africa